Sir Mark Justin Lyall Grant,  (born 29 May 1956) is a former senior British diplomat who was previously the United Kingdom's National Security Adviser and Permanent Representative of the United Kingdom to the United Nations.

Education and early life 
Born in Hammersmith to Mary (née Moore) and Maj Gen Ian Lyall Grant MC, Grant was educated at Eton College and read law at the University of Cambridge as a student of Trinity College, Cambridge. He was called to the bar at Middle Temple, London before joining the Foreign and Commonwealth Office in 1980.

Career
Lyall Grant was British Permanent Representative to the United Nations (UN) from 2009 to 2015. He held the office of President of the United Nations Security Council four times: in November 2010, March 2012, June 2013, and August 2014.

Lyall Grant was appointed a Companion of the Order of St Michael and St George (CMG) in the 2003 New Year Honours before being promoted to Knight Commander (KCMG) in the 2006 Birthday Honours and a Knight Grand Cross in the 2018 New Year Honours.

On 7 July 2015, Number 10 Downing St announced that Lyall Grant would replace Sir Kim Darroch as the United Kingdom's National Security Advisor on 7 September 2015, with Darroch moving to a different diplomatic post. As of September 2015, Lyall Grant was paid a salary of between £160,000 and £164,999, making him one of the 328 most highly paid people in the British public sector at that time. On 27 February 2017 it was announced that Lyall Grant would retire in April and be replaced by the Home Office Permanent Secretary Mark Sedwill. Since 2017, he has served on the governing board at Eton College.

Foreign and Commonwealth Office career timeline 
 2015–17 National Security Adviser
 2009–15 British Permanent Representative to the United Nations
 2007–09 FCO, Director General for Political Affairs
 2003–06 High Commissioner to Pakistan
 2000–03 FCO director, Africa
 1998–2000 Head, European Union department, FCO
 1996–98 Deputy High Commissioner and Consul General, South Africa
 1994–96 Seconded to European Secretariat, Cabinet Office
 1990–93 First Secretary, Paris
 1987–89 Private Secretary to Minister of State, FCO
 1985–87 FCO
 1982–85 Second Secretary, Islamabad
 1980–82 FCO, worked in Southern Africa department

Personal life

His wife, Sheila, is also a diplomat. In April 2012, Lady Lyall Grant, with Huberta von Voss Wittig, made a video appeal to Asma al-Assad, calling on the Syrian first lady to take a stand against violence in her country. The Lyall Grants have a son and a daughter. Lyall Grant's spare time activities include golf, tennis, and bridge.

References

Offices held 

1956 births
Living people
People educated at Eton College
Alumni of Trinity College, Cambridge
High Commissioners of the United Kingdom to Pakistan
Knights Grand Cross of the Order of St Michael and St George
Permanent Representatives of the United Kingdom to the United Nations
Members of HM Diplomatic Service
20th-century British diplomats
21st-century British diplomats